Ketari is a small town in Bentong District, Pahang, Malaysia. The old Shell petrol station and the Tengku Sulaiman Mosque are two of the oldest landmarks in this town.

References

Bentong District
Towns in Pahang